Aquilegia barnebyi, commonly known as the oil shale columbine or Barneby's columbine, is a perennial species of flowering plant in the buttercup family, with a native range comprising northeastern Utah and northwestern Colorado in the United States. It is named after Rupert Charles Barneby, who, with Harry Dwight Dillon Ripley, first discovered it in Colorado.

Description 
Its nodding flowers have pink sepals, while the petals are yellow with reddish-pink spurs.

Habitat and distribution 
Aquilegia barnebyi is endemic to the Uinta Basin (Duchesne and Uintah counties) in Utah, and to Garfield, Gunnison, Montrose, Pitkin, and Rio Blanco counties in Colorado. It grows on moist, exposed oil shale in cliffs and rocky slopes, and in pinyon-juniper woodlands. In the 1980s it was thought to be rare in Utah, and was considered for protection under the Endangered Species Act; as of 2021, it thought to be sufficiently widespread and abundant as not to be at risk of extinction.

Phylogeny 
Analysis of chloroplast DNA showed A. barnebyi is closely related to A. coerulea, a species of Aquilegia native to southern Wyoming, Colorado, and northern New Mexico.

Cultivation 
Aquilegia barnebyi grows in full sun to part shade, and is suitable for rock gardens. It is drought tolerant, but is not tolerant of salty conditions. Aquilegia 'Firelight' is a cultivar that has been selected for shorter stems and ombre yellow–pink flowers.

References 

barnebyi
Flora of Colorado
Flora of Utah
Plants described in 1949